Maharana Shambhu Singh  (22 December 1847 – 7 October 1874), was the Maharana (r. 1861–1874) of Princely state of Udaipur. He was a son Sher Singh of Bagore and nephew of Maharana Swarup Singh. The rich and diverse land of India had faced numerous invasions and marauding before the British set their foot as merchants and slowly took over the dominance of the Indian main land. With the great Indian rebellion of 1857, the governance of India was transferred to the Queen and a new era had begun with Maharana Shambhu Singh ascending the throne of Mewar.

He was a descendant of Maharana Sangram Singh II; was adopted by Maharana Swarup Singh as his nominated heir. Maharana Shambhu Singh ascended the throne as a minor and a British Political agent was appointed to guide the young Maharana. Unlike his predecessors, the financial conditions at the time were relatively stable and progressive and he continued to replenish the state treasury after he was provided full powers as the king of Mewar.

After attaining complete control, he set up various new rules and offices for improving administrative resources, organised administration and income of temples and sacred places and introduced new legal code for Mewar. Under him the military was reorganised, various jail reforms were introduced and new construction of roads and railway tracks started. In spite of being formally uneducated, he gave education supreme importance and expanded various existing schools and introduced numerous new ones. Most importantly, he was the first to set up a school for girls and thus promoted opportunities of education for everyone. He enforced special measures to curb the Sati pratha and imposed heavy monetary fines on offenders.

Thus with various reforms in public facilities and infrastructure, Shambhu Singh was considered a liberal and well-managed king of his times. But with his untimely death at a young age of 27 years, his dreams of the revival of his homeland to the ancient golden times were stalled. He left behind no heir and his nephew Sajjan Singh, who himself was a minor at the time of his death; succeeded him and went ahead in continuation with the reforms paved by his predecessor.

References

Knights Grand Commander of the Order of the Star of India
Mewar dynasty
1847 births
1874 deaths